{{DISPLAYTITLE:Lp space}}

In mathematics, the  spaces are function spaces defined using a natural generalization of the -norm for finite-dimensional vector spaces. They are sometimes called Lebesgue spaces, named after Henri Lebesgue , although according to the Bourbaki group  they were first introduced by Frigyes Riesz . 

 spaces form an important class of Banach spaces in functional analysis, and of topological vector spaces. Because of their key role in the mathematical analysis of measure and probability spaces, Lebesgue spaces are used also in the theoretical discussion of problems in physics, statistics, economics, finance, engineering, and other disciplines.

Applications

Statistics

In statistics, measures of central tendency and statistical dispersion, such as the mean, median, and standard deviation, are defined in terms of  metrics, and measures of central tendency can be characterized as solutions to variational problems.

In penalized regression, "L1 penalty" and "L2 penalty" refer to penalizing either the  norm of a solution's vector of parameter values (i.e. the sum of its absolute values), or its  norm (its Euclidean length). Techniques which use an L1 penalty, like LASSO, encourage solutions where many parameters are zero. Techniques which use an L2 penalty, like ridge regression, encourage solutions where most parameter values are small. Elastic net regularization uses a penalty term that is a combination of the  norm and the  norm of the parameter vector.

Hausdorff–Young inequality

By contrast, if  the Fourier transform does not map into

Hilbert spaces

Hilbert spaces are central to many applications, from quantum mechanics to stochastic calculus.

The -norm in finite dimensions

The length of a vector  in the -dimensional real vector space  is usually given by the Euclidean norm:

In many situations, the Euclidean distance is insufficient for capturing the actual distances in a given space. An analogy to this is suggested by taxi drivers in a grid street plan who should measure distance not in terms of the length of the straight line to their destination, but in terms of the rectilinear distance, which takes into account that streets are either orthogonal or parallel to each other. The class of -norms generalizes these two examples and has an abundance of applications in many parts of mathematics, physics, and computer science.

Definition

The Euclidean norm from above falls into this class and is the -norm, and the -norm is the norm that corresponds to the rectilinear distance.

The -norm or maximum norm (or uniform norm) is the limit of the -norms for  It turns out that this limit is equivalent to the following definition:

See -infinity.

For all  the -norms and maximum norm as defined above indeed satisfy the properties of a "length function" (or norm), which are that:
only the zero vector has zero length,
the length of the vector is positive homogeneous with respect to multiplication by a scalar (positive homogeneity), and
the length of the sum of two vectors is no larger than the sum of lengths of the vectors (triangle inequality).
Abstractly speaking, this means that  together with the -norm is a normed vector space. Moreover, it turns out that this space is complete, thus making it a Banach space. This Banach space is the -space over

Relations between -norms

The grid distance or rectilinear distance (sometimes called the "Manhattan distance") between two points is never shorter than the length of the line segment between them (the Euclidean or "as the crow flies" distance). Formally, this means that the Euclidean norm of any vector is bounded by its 1-norm:

This fact generalizes to -norms in that the -norm  of any given vector  does not grow with :

For the opposite direction, the following relation between the -norm and the -norm is known:

This inequality depends on the dimension  of the underlying vector space and follows directly from the Cauchy–Schwarz inequality.

In general, for vectors in  where 

This is a consequence of Hölder's inequality.

When 

In  for  the formula

defines an absolutely homogeneous function for  however, the resulting function does not define a norm, because it is not subadditive. On the other hand, the formula

defines a subadditive function at the cost of losing absolute homogeneity. It does define an F-norm, though, which is homogeneous of degree 

Hence, the function

defines a metric. The metric space  is denoted by 

shows that the infinite-dimensional sequence space  defined below, is no longer locally convex.

When 

There is one  norm and another function called the  "norm" (with quotation marks).

The mathematical definition of the  norm was established by Banach's Theory of Linear Operations. The space of sequences has a complete metric topology provided by the F-norm

which is discussed by Stefan Rolewicz in Metric Linear Spaces. The -normed space is studied in functional analysis, probability theory, and harmonic analysis.

Another function was called the  "norm" by David Donoho—whose quotation marks warn that this function is not a proper norm—is the number of non-zero entries of the vector  Many authors abuse terminology by omitting the quotation marks.

This is not a norm because it is not homogeneous. For example, scaling the vector  by a positive constant does not change the "norm". Despite these defects as a mathematical norm, the non-zero counting "norm" has uses in scientific computing, information theory, and statistics–notably in compressed sensing in signal processing and computational harmonic analysis. Despite not being a norm, the associated metric, known as Hamming distance, is a valid distance, since homogeneity is not required for distances.

The -norm in infinite dimensions and  spaces

The sequence space 

The -norm can be extended to vectors that have an infinite number of components (sequences), which yields the space This contains as special cases:
  the space of sequences whose series is absolutely convergent,
  the space of square-summable sequences, which is a Hilbert space, and
  the space of bounded sequences.

The space of sequences has a natural vector space structure by applying addition and scalar multiplication coordinate by coordinate. Explicitly, the vector sum and the scalar action for infinite sequences of real (or complex) numbers are given by:

Define the -norm:

Here, a complication arises, namely that the series on the right is not always convergent, so for example, the sequence made up of only ones,  will have an infinite -norm for  The space  is then defined as the set of all infinite sequences of real (or complex) numbers such that the -norm is finite.

One can check that as  increases, the set  grows larger. For example, the sequence

One also defines the -norm using the supremum:

and the corresponding space  of all bounded sequences. It turns out that

if the right-hand side is finite, or the left-hand side is infinite. Thus, we will consider  spaces for 

The fully general  space is obtained—as seen below—by considering vectors, not only with finitely or countably-infinitely many components, but with "arbitrarily many components"; in other words, functions. An integral instead of a sum is used to define the -norm.

General ℓp-space

In complete analogy to the preceding definition one can define the space  over a general index set  (and ) as

where convergence on the right means that only countably many summands are nonzero (see also Unconditional convergence).
With the norm

the space  becomes a Banach space.
In the case where  is finite with  elements, this construction yields  with the -norm defined above.
If  is countably infinite, this is exactly the sequence space  defined above.
For uncountable sets  this is a non-separable Banach space which can be seen as the locally convex direct limit of -sequence spaces.

On  it can be defined by

while for the space  associated with a measure space  which consists of all square-integrable functions, it is 

Now consider the case  Define

where for all 

The index set  can be turned into a measure space by giving it the discrete σ-algebra and the counting measure. Then the space  is just a special case of the more general -space (defined below).

Lp spaces and Lebesgue integrals

An  space may be defined as a space of measurable functions for which the -th power of the absolute value is Lebesgue integrable, where functions which agree almost everywhere are identified. More generally, let  and  be a measure space.

For  the space  is the space of measurable functions  bounded almost everywhere, whose seminorm  is the infimum of (the absolute values of) these bounds, which when  is the same as the essential supremum of its absolute value:
 
If  is a measurable function that is equal to  almost everywhere then  for every  and thus  for all  

Seminormed space of -th power integrable functions

Each set of functions  forms a vector space when addition and scalar multiplication are defined pointwise. 
although it is also a consequence of Minkowski's inequality 
 
which establishes that  satisfies the triangle inequality. 
That  is closed under scalar multiplication is due to  being absolutely homogeneous, which means that  for every scalar  and every function  

Absolute homogeneity, the triangle inequality, and non-negativity are the defining properties of a seminorm. 
Thus  is a seminorm and the set  of -th power integrable functions together with the function  defines a seminormed vector space.

Quotient vector space

If the seminorm  happens to be a norm then the normed quotient space that will now be defined is linearly isometrically isomorphic to  they will be, up to a linear isometry, the same normed space and so they may both be called " space".

If  is any measurable function, then  if and only if  almost everywhere. Since the right hand side ( a.e.) does not mention  it follows that all seminorms  have the same zero set/kernel (it does not depend on ). So denote this common vector subspace by

Given any  the coset  consists of all measurable functions  that are equal to  almost everywhere. Two cosets are equal  if and only if  almost everywhere, which happens if and only if  
The set of all cosets 
 

The -norm on the quotient vector space

Given any  the value of the seminorm  on the coset  is constant and equal to  denote this unique value by  so that:
 
The value  of a coset  is independent of the particular function  that was chosen to represent the coset since if  is any other function then  if and only if  if and only if  almost everywhere, in which case  and so  does indeed equal  

The Lebesgue  space

When the underlying measure space  is understood then  is often abbreviated  or even just  
Depending on the author, the subscript notation  might denote either  or  

The above definitions generalize to Bochner spaces. 

Special cases

Similar to the  spaces,  is the only Hilbert space among  spaces.

The additional inner product structure allows for a richer theory, with applications to, for instance, Fourier series and quantum mechanics.

If we use complex-valued functions, the space  is a commutative C*-algebra with pointwise multiplication and conjugation. For many measure spaces, including all sigma-finite ones, it is in fact a commutative von Neumann algebra. An element of  defines a bounded operator on any  space by multiplication.

As any Hilbert space, every space  is linearly isometric to a suitable  where the cardinality of the set  is the cardinality of an arbitrary Hilbertian basis for this particular

Properties of Lp spaces

As in the discrete case, if there exists  such that  then

Hölder's inequality

Suppose  satisfy  (where ). If  and  then  and 

 
where the supremum is taken over the closed unit ball of  then  and

Minkowski inequality

Minkowski inequality, which states that  satisfies the triangle inequality, can be generalized: 
If the measurable function  is non-negative then for all

Atomic decomposition

and for every integer  
 
and

These inequalities guarantee that  for all integers  while the supports of  being pairwise disjoint implies 

An atomic decomposition can be explicitly given by first defining for every integer  

(this infimum is attained by  that is,  holds) and then letting

where  denotes the measure of the set  and  denotes the indicator function of the set  

where the integration is with respect to the usual Lebesgue measure on

Dual spaces

This isomorphism associates  with the functional  defined by
 
for every 

The fact that  is well defined and continuous follows from Hölder's inequality.  is a linear mapping which is an isometry by the extremal case of Hölder's inequality. It is also possible to show (for example with the Radon–Nikodym theorem, see) that any  can be expressed this way: i.e., that  is onto. Since  is onto and isometric, it is an isomorphism of Banach spaces. With this (isometric) isomorphism in mind, it is usual to say simply that  is the continuous dual space of 

For  the space  is reflexive. Let  be as above and let  be the corresponding linear isometry.

This map coincides with the canonical embedding  of  into its bidual. Moreover, the map  is onto, as composition of two onto isometries, and this proves reflexivity.

Elements of  can be identified with bounded signed finitely additive measures on  that are absolutely continuous with respect to  See ba space for more details. If we assume the axiom of choice, this space is much bigger than  except in some trivial cases.

Embeddings

Colloquially, if  then  contains functions that are more locally singular, while elements of  can be more spread out. Consider the Lebesgue measure on the half line  A continuous function in  might blow up near  but must decay sufficiently fast toward infinity. On the other hand, continuous functions in  need not decay at all but no blow-up is allowed. The precise technical result is the following. 
Suppose that  Then:

 if and only if  does not contain sets of finite but arbitrarily large measure, and
 if and only if  does not contain sets of non-zero but arbitrarily small measure.

Neither condition holds for the real line with the Lebesgue measure.
(This is a consequence of the closed graph theorem and properties of  spaces.) 
Indeed, if the domain  has finite measure, one can make the following explicit calculation using Hölder's inequality

leading to

The constant appearing in the above inequality is optimal, in the sense that the operator norm of the identity  is precisely

the case of equality being achieved exactly when  -almost-everywhere.

Dense subspaces

Throughout this section we assume that 

Let  be a measure space.

More can be said when  is a normal topological space and  its Borel –algebra, i.e., the smallest –algebra of subsets of  containing the open sets.

If  can be covered by an increasing sequence  of open sets that have finite measure, then the space of –integrable continuous functions is dense in  More precisely, one can use bounded continuous functions that vanish outside one of the open sets  

This applies in particular when  and when  is the Lebesgue measure. The space of continuous and compactly supported functions is dense in  Similarly, the space of integrable step functions is dense in  this space is the linear span of indicator functions of bounded intervals when  of bounded rectangles when  and more generally of products of bounded intervals.

where

Closed subspaces

Let  be a measure space. If  then  can be defined as above: it is the quotient vector space of those measurable functions  such that

As before, we may introduce the -norm  but  does not satisfy the triangle inequality in this case, and defines only a quasi-norm. The inequality  valid for  implies that 

and so the function

is a metric on  The resulting metric space is complete; the verification is similar to the familiar case when 
The balls 

form a local base at the origin for this topology, as  ranges over the positive reals. These balls satisfy  for all real  which in particular shows that  is a bounded neighborhood of the origin; in other words, this space is locally bounded, just like every normed space, despite  not being a norm. 

In this setting  satisfies a reverse Minkowski inequality, that is for 

Specifically, this is true if the measure space  contains an infinite family of disjoint measurable sets of finite positive measure.

As a particular consequence, there are no nonzero continuous linear functionals on  the continuous dual space is the zero space.

The situation of having no linear functionals is highly undesirable for the purposes of doing analysis.

, the space of measurable functions

When  is a probability measure (i.e.), this mode of convergence is named convergence in probability.

The description is easier when  is finite. If  is a finite measure on  the  function admits for the convergence in measure the following fundamental system of neighborhoods

The topology can be defined by any metric  of the form

The space  is in general not locally bounded, and not locally convex.

For the infinite Lebesgue measure  on  the definition of the fundamental system of neighborhoods could be modified as follows

Generalizations and extensions

Weak 

A function  is said to be in the space weak , or  if there is a constant  such that, for all 

The weak  coincide with the Lorentz spaces  so this notation is also used to denote them.

The -norm is not a true norm, since the triangle inequality fails to hold.

and in particular  

In fact, one has

and raising to power  and taking the supremum in  one has

Under the convention that two functions are equal if they are equal  almost everywhere, then the spaces  are complete .

For any  the expression

is comparable to the -norm. Further in the case  this expression defines a norm if  Hence for  the weak  spaces are Banach spaces .

A major result that uses the -spaces is the Marcinkiewicz interpolation theorem, which has broad applications to harmonic analysis and the study of singular integrals.

Weighted  spaces

As before, consider a measure space  Let  be a measurable function. The -weighted  space is defined as  where  means the measure  defined by

spaces on manifolds

One may also define spaces  on a manifold, called the intrinsic  spaces of the manifold, using densities.

Vector-valued  spaces

One way is to define the spaces of Bochner integrable and Pettis integrable functions, and then endow them with locally convex TVS-topologies that are (each in their own way) a natural generalization of the usual  topology. Alexander Grothendieck showed that when  is a nuclear space (a concept he introduced), then these two constructions are, respectively, canonically TVS-isomorphic with the spaces of Bochner and Pettis integral functions mentioned earlier; in short, they are indistinguishable.

See also

Notes

References

 .
  
 .
 .
 .
 
 .
 .

External links

 
 Proof that Lp spaces are complete

Banach spaces
Function spaces
Mathematical series
Measure theory
Normed spaces
Lp spaces